The mugger crocodile (Crocodylus palustris) is a medium-sized broad-snouted crocodile, also known as mugger and marsh crocodile. It is native to freshwater habitats from southern Iran to the Indian subcontinent, where it inhabits marshes, lakes, rivers and artificial ponds. Both young and adult mugger crocodiles dig burrows to which they retreat when the ambient temperature drops below  or exceeds . Females dig holes in the sand as nesting sites and lay up to 46 eggs during the dry season. The sex of hatchlings depends on temperature during incubation. Both parents protect the young for up to one year. They feed on insects, and adults prey on fish, reptiles, birds and mammals.

The mugger crocodile evolved at least  and has been a symbol for the fructifying and destructive powers of the rivers since the Vedic period. It was first scientifically described in 1831 and is protected by law in Iran, India and Sri Lanka. Since 1982, it has been listed as Vulnerable on the IUCN Red List. Outside protected areas, it is threatened by conversion of natural habitats, gets entangled in fishing nets and is killed in human–wildlife conflict situations and in traffic accidents.

Taxonomy and evolution
Crocodilus palustris was the scientific name proposed by René Lesson in 1831 who described the type specimen from the Gangetic plains. In subsequent years, several naturalists and curators of natural history museums described zoological specimens and proposed different names, including: 
C. bombifrons by John Edward Gray in 1844 for a specimen sent by the Museum of the Royal Asiatic Society of Bengal to the British Museum of Natural History.
C. trigonops also by Gray in 1844 for a young mugger specimen from India.

Evolution 
A paleogenomics analysis indicated that Crocodylus likely originated in Africa and radiated towards Southeast Asia and the Americas, diverging from its closest recent relative, the extinct Voay of Madagascar, around  near the Oligocene/Miocene boundary.
Within Crocodylus, the mugger crocodile's closest living relatives are the Siamese crocodile and the saltwater crocodile.

Fossil crocodile specimens excavated in the Sivalik Hills closely resemble the mugger crocodile in the shortness of the premaxillae and in the form of the nasal openings. Crocodylus palaeindicus from late Pliocene sediments in the Sivalik Hills is thought to be an ancestor of the mugger crocodile. Fossil remains of C. palaeindicus were also excavated in the vicinity of Bagan in central Myanmar.

Below cladogram is from a tip dating study, for which morphological, molecular DNA sequencing and stratigraphic fossil age data were simultaneously used to establish the inter-relationships within Crocodylidae. This cladogram was revised in a paleogenomics study.

Characteristics

Mugger crocodile hatchlings are pale olive with black spots. Adults are dark olive to grey or brown. The head is rough without any ridges and has large scutes around the neck that is well separated from the back. Scutes usually form four, rarely six longitudinal series and 16 or 17 transverse series. The limbs have keeled scales with serrated fringes on outer edges, and outer toes are extensively webbed. The snout is slightly longer than broad with 19 upper teeth on each side. The symphysis of the lower jaw extends to the level of the fourth or fifth tooth. The premaxillary suture on the palate is nearly straight or curved forwards, and the nasal bones separate the premaxilla above.

The mugger crocodile is considered a medium-sized crocodilian, but has the broadest snout among living crocodiles. It has a powerful tail and webbed feet. Its visual, hearing and smelling senses are acute. The largest known muggers measured .
The largest zoological specimen in the British Museum of Natural History measures .

Distribution and habitat

It inhabits freshwater lakes, rivers and marshes, and prefers slow-moving, shallow water bodies. It also thrives in artificial reservoirs and irrigation canals.

In Iran, the mugger occurs along rivers in Sistan and Baluchestan Provinces along the Iran–Pakistan border. A population of around 200 mugger crocodiles lives on the Iranian Makran coast near Chabahar. Due to human activity and a long drought in the late 1990s and early 2000s, it had been pushed to the brink of extinction. Following several tropical cyclones in 2007 and 2010, much of the habitat of the mugger crocodiles has been restored as formerly dry lakes and hamuns were flooded again.

In Pakistan, a small population lives in 21 ponds around Dasht River; in the winter of 2007–08, 99 individuals were counted. By 2017, the population had declined to 25 individuals. In Sindh Province, small mugger populations occur in wetlands of Deh Akro 2 and Nara Desert Wildlife Sanctuaries, near Chotiari Dam, in the Nara Canal and around Haleji lake.

In Nepal's Terai, it occurs in the wetlands of Shuklaphanta and Bardia National Parks, Ghodaghodi Tal, Chitwan National Park and Koshi Tappu Wildlife Reserve.

In India, it occurs in:
Rajasthan along the Chambal, Ken and Son Rivers, and in Ranthambore National Park
Gujarat along the Vishwamitri River and several reservoirs and lakes in Kutch
Madhya Pradesh's National Chambal Sanctuary
Uttarakhand's Rajaji National Park, Corbett Tiger Reserve and Lansdowne Forest Division 
Uttar Pradesh's Katarniaghat and Kishanpur Wildlife Sanctuaries
Odisha's Simlipal National Park and along Mahanadi and Sabari Rivers In 2019, 82 individuals were recorded in the river systems of Simlipal National Park.
Telangana's Manjira Wildlife Sanctuary
Maharashtra's Kadavi and Warna Rivers, and Savitri River in Raigad District.
Goa's Salaulim Reservoir, Zuari River and in small lakes
Karnataka along Kaveri and Kabini Rivers, in the Ranganthittu Bird Sanctuary, Nagarhole National Park and Tungabhadra Reservoir
Kerala's Parambikulam Reservoir and Neyyar Wildlife Sanctuary
Tamil Nadu's Amaravathi Reservoir, Moyar and Kaveri rivers.

In Sri Lanka, it occurs in Wilpattu, Yala and Bundala National Parks. Between 1991 and 1996, it was recorded in another 102 localities.

In Bangladesh, it was historically present in the northern parts of the Sundarbans, where four to five captive individuals survived in an artificial pond by the 1980s. It is possibly locally extinct in the country.
In Bhutan, it became extinct in the late 1960s, but a few captive-bred individuals were released in the Manas River in the late 1990s. It is considered locally extinct in Myanmar.

Behaviour and ecology

The mugger crocodile is a powerful swimmer that uses its tail and hind feet to move forward, change direction and submerge. It belly-walks, with its belly touching ground, at the bottom of waterbodies and on land. During the hot dry season, it walks over land at night to find suitable wetlands and spends most of the day submerged in water. During the cold season it basks on riverbanks, individuals are tolerant of others during this period. Territorial behaviour increases during the mating season.

It digs burrows to retreat from extreme temperatures and other harsh climatic conditions.

Hunting and diet
The mugger crocodile preys on fish, snakes, turtles, birds and mammals including monkeys, squirrels, rodents, otters and dogs. It also scavenges on dead animals. During dry seasons, muggers walk many kilometers over land in search of water and prey. Hatchlings feed mainly on insects such as beetles, but also on crabs and shrimp and on vertebrates later on. It seizes and drags potential prey approaching watersides into the water, when the opportunity arises. Adult muggers were observed feeding on a flapshell turtle and a tortoise. Subadult and adult muggers favour fish, but also prey on small to medium-sized ungulates up to the size of chital (Axis axis). In Bardia National Park, a mugger was observed caching a chital kill beneath the roots of a tree and returning to its basking site. A part of the deer was still wedged among the roots on the next day. Muggers have also been observed while preying and feeding on a python. At the Chambal River, muggers have attacked water buffaloes, cattle and goats.
In Yala National Park, a mugger was observed killing a large Indian pangolin (Manis crassicaudata), of which it devoured pieces over several hours.

Tool use

Mugger crocodiles have been documented using lures to hunt birds. This means they are among the first reptiles recorded to use tools. By balancing sticks and branches on their heads, they lure birds that are looking for nesting material. This strategy is particularly effective during the nesting season.

Reproduction
The reproduction cycle starts earliest in November at the onset of the cold season with courtship and mating. They lay up to two clutches with 8 –46 eggs each. Eggs weigh  on average. Laying of one clutch usually takes less than half an hour. Thereafter, females scrape sand over the nest to close it. Males have been observed to assist females in digging and protecting nest sites. Hatching season is two months later, between April and June in south India, and in Sri Lanka between August and September. Then females excavate the young, pick them up in their snouts and take them to the water. Both females and males protect the young for up to one year.

Sex ratio of hatched eggs depends on incubation temperature and exposure of nests to sunshine. Temperature in natural nests is not constant but varies between nights and days. The percentage of male hatchlings increases in late nests located in sunny sites.

Sympatric predators

The distribution of the mugger crocodile overlaps with that of the saltwater crocodile in a few coastal areas, but it barely enters brackish water and prefers shallow waterways. It is an apex predator in freshwater ecosystems. It is sympatric with the gharial (Gavialis gangeticus) in the Rapti and Narayani Rivers, in the eastern Mahanadi, and in tributaries of the Ganges and Yamuna rivers.

The Bengal tiger (Panthera tigris tigris) occasionally fights mugger crocodiles off prey and rarely preys on adult mugger crocodiles in Ranthambore National Park. The Asiatic lion (Panthera leo leo) can sometimes prey on crocodiles on the banks of the Kamleshwar Dam in Gir National Park during dry, hot months.

Threats 
The mugger crocodile is threatened by habitat destruction because of conversion of natural habitats for agricultural and industrial use. As humans encroach into its habitat, the incidents of conflict increase. Muggers are entangled in fishing equipment and drown, and are killed in areas where fishermen perceive them as competition.
Major wetlands in Pakistan were drained in the 1990s by dams and channels to funnel natural streams and agricultural runoffs into rivers.

In Gujarat, two muggers were found killed, one in 2015 with the tail cut off and internal organs missing; the other in 2017, also with the tail cut off. The missing body parts indicate that the crocodiles were sacrificed in superstitious practices or used as aphrodisiacs.
Between 2005 and 2018, 38 mugger crocodiles were victims of traffic accidents on roads and railway tracks in Gujarat; 29 were found dead, four died during treatment, and five were returned to the wild after medical care. In 2017, a dead mugger was found on a railway track in Rajasthan.

Conservation 
The mugger crocodile is listed in CITES Appendix I, hence international commercial trade is prohibited. It has been listed as Vulnerable on the IUCN Red List since 1982. By 2013, less than 8,700 mature individuals were estimated to live in the wild and no population unit to comprise more than 1,000 individuals.

In India, it has been protected since 1972 under Schedule I of the Wildlife Protection Act, 1972, which prohibits catching, killing and transporting a crocodile without a permit; offenders face imprisonment and a fine.
In Sri Lanka, it was listed in Schedule IV of the Fauna & Flora Protection Ordinance in 1946, which allowed for shooting one crocodile with a permit. Today, it is strictly protected, but law enforcement in Sri Lanka is lacking.
In Iran, the mugger crocodile is listed as endangered and has been legally protected since 2013; capturing and killing a crocodile is punished with a fine of 100 million Iranian rials.

Since large muggers occasionally take livestock, this leads to conflict with local people living close to mugger habitat. In Maharashtra, local people are compensated for loss of close relatives and livestock. Local people in Baluchestan respect the mugger crocodile as a water living creature and do not harm it. If an individual kills livestock, the owner is compensated for the loss. The mugger crocodile is translocated in severe conflict cases.

A total of 1,193 captive bred muggers were released to restock populations in 28 protected areas in India between 1978 and 1992. Production of new offspring was halted by the Indian Government in 1994.

In culture

The Sanskrit word  मकर 'makara' refers to the crocodile and a mythical crocodile-like animal. The Hindi word for crocodile is मगर 'magar'. In English language, both names 'mugger' and 'magar' were used around the turn of the 20th century. The names 'marsh crocodile' and 'broad-snouted crocodile' have been used since the late 1930s.

The crocodile is acknowledged as the prototype of the makara and symbolises both the fructifying and the destructive powers of the rivers. It is the animal vehicle of the Vedic deity Varuna and of several nature spirits called yakshas. In Hindu mythology, it represents virility as a vehicle of Ganga and as an emblem of Kamadeva. A stone carving of a mugger crocodile was part of a beam of a gateway to the Bharhut Stupa built around 100 BC.

The traditional biography of the Indian saint Adi Shankara includes an incident where he is grabbed by a crocodile in the Kaladi river, which releases him only after his mother reluctantly let him choose the ascetic path of a Sannyasa. The Muslim saint Pīr Mango is said to have taken care of crocodiles and created a stream to trickle out of a rock near Karachi in the 13th century. This place was later walled around, and about 40 mugger crocodiles were kept in the reservoir called Magar Talao in the 1870s; they were fed by both Hindu and Muslim pilgrims. Mugger crocodiles have also been kept in tanks near Hindu temples built in the vicinity of rivers; these crocodiles are considered sacred. In the early 20th century, young married women fed the crocodiles in Khan Jahan Ali's Tank in Jessore in the hope of being blessed with children.

Vasava, Gamit and Chodhri tribes in Gujarat worship the crocodile god Mogra Dev asking for children, good crops and milk yield of their cows. They carve wooden statues symbolising Mogra Dev and mount them on poles. Their offerings during the installation ceremony include rice, milk, wine, heart and liver of a chicken, and a mixture of vermillion, oil and coconut fibres. Fatal attacks of mugger crocodiles on humans were documented in Gujarat and Maharasthra, but they rarely consumed the victims who died of drowning.

A fable from the Jataka tales of Buddhist traditions features a clever monkey outwitting a crocodile. Three folktales feature crocodiles and jackals. A mugger crocodile is one of the characters in The Undertakers, a chapter of The Second Jungle Book. The children’s book Adventures of a Nepali Frog features the character Mugger, the crocodile who lives by the Rapti River in Chitwan National Park.

See also
 Crocodiles in India
 List of reptiles of South Asia

References

External links

Apex predators
Crocodylidae
Fauna of South Asia
Reptiles of Iran
Reptiles of Pakistan
Reptiles of India
Reptiles of Nepal
Reptiles of Sri Lanka
National symbols of Pakistan
Tool-using animals
Reptiles described in 1831
Taxa named by René Lesson
Crocodilians of Asia